Pulchellodromus medius is a spider species found in Europe (Italy, Greece, Cyprus, Ukrain) and Asia (Turkey, Israel, Iran, Azerbaijan).

See also 
 List of Philodromidae species

References

External links 

Philodromus
Spiders of Europe
Spiders of Asia
Spiders described in 1872